Mobye Narapati (Narapati III of Ava) also Sao Hso Kaw Hpa of Mong Pai
was the penultimate king of Ava who reigned from 1545 to 1551. The ethnically Shan king ruled as the disputed leader of the Confederation of Shan states that had ruled Ava since 1527. He ended the seven years' war with Toungoo as soon as he came to power. Throughout his six years of reign, he faced an active rebellion by Sithu Kyawhtin, who was supported by the Shan state of Mohnyin. He controlled only a rump state, east of the Irrawaddy and north of Pagan (Bagan). After he was finally driven out of Ava (Inwa) in October 1551, he fled south to Pegu (Bago) where he was given protection by King Bayinnaung of Toungoo Dynasty. He lived out his years at Pegu.

Early life
The future king was a son of Hkonmaing, who was saopha (chief) of the Shan state of Onbaung–Hsipaw (Thibaw) his personal name in Shan language is Hso Kaw Hpa of Mong Pai
. His father later appointed him chief of Mobye (present day northern Kayah State), which was a vassal state of Onbaung–Hsipaw. He remained in Mobye even when his father was elected by the Ava court to become king of Ava in 1542. Three tumultuous years later, after his father's death c. September 1545, the 29-year-old chief of Mobye succeeded the Ava throne with the royal style of Narapati III.

Reign
Narapati III inherited not only an ongoing war with Toungoo but also an active Mohnyin-backed rebellion in Sagaing by Sithu Kyawhtin. The territory he inherited was already badly splintered. The Ava "Kingdom" had already lost all of Central Burma from Pagan (Bagan) southward since 1544, and further split into two halves: the Mohnyin-controlled west of the Irrawaddy (present-day Sagaing Region and southern Kachin State), and Hsipaw/Onbaung-controlled eastern half (approximately, northern Mandalay Region and western Shan State).

Unable to fight two wars, Narapati III sued for peace with Toungoo, agreeing to cede all of Central Burma. He was merely acknowledging the facts on the ground. His offer was accepted by King Tabinshwehti of Toungoo. He then tried to persuade Sithu Kyawhtin to come over to his side. But Sithu Kyawhtin was loyal to his overlord Sawlon II of Mohnyin, and both were not interested in a truce. They believed that the Ava throne rightfully belonged to Mohnyin since it was Sawlon I of Mohnyin who led the Confederation to conquer Ava in 1527. Furthermore, they found it jarring that Narapati III belonged to the House of Hsipaw which bitterly fought against Mohnyin in the 1520s. Failing at diplomacy, Narapati attacked Sagaing but could not take it.

An uneasy stalemate ensued in the next five years. Narapati was an average ruler but his cross river rival Sithu Kyawhtin proved to be an able ruler, who increasingly commanded more manpower. Indeed, by 1549, Sithu Kyawhtin had been acknowledged as an equal by Sawlon II, his former overlord. Narapati had no answers when Sithu Kyawhtin attacked Ava in September 1551. He resisted for about a month but fled south to Pegu where he was given protection by King Bayinnaung.

Aftermath
He lived out his life in Pegu. One of his daughters, Khin Aung Kham, was a minor queen of Bayinnaung. He was one of four former kings (along with Sithu Kyawhtin of Ava, Mekuti of Lan Na and Maha Chakkraphat of Siam) honored by Bayinnaung at the opening ceremony of the newly rebuilt Kanbawzathadi Palace on 16 March 1568.

Notes

References

Bibliography
 
 
 
 
 

Ava dynasty
1516 births
Year of death unknown
16th-century Burmese monarchs